Danais (Ancient Greek: Δαναΐς) refers to a lost ancient Greek epic written by one of the cyclic poets. The Danaid tetralogy of Aeschylus undoubtedly draws its material from this particular literary work. Danais is represented in the table of epics in the received canon on the very fragmentary "Borgia table" as "Danaides".

References

Ancient Greek epic poems
Lost poems
Mythology of Argos